The 2016 Tre Valli Varesine was the 96th edition of the Tre Valli Varesine road cycling one day race. It was held on 27 September 2016 as part of the 2016 UCI Europe Tour in category 1.HC, over a distance of 192.9 km, starting in Saronno and ending in Varese.

Teams
Twenty-seven teams were invited to take part in the race. These included ten UCI WorldTeams, thirteen UCI Professional Continental teams, three UCI Continental teams and the Italian national team.

National team
 Italy

Results

References 

Tre Valli Varesine
Tre Valli Varesine
Tre Valli Varesine